Dramatists listed in chronological order by country and language:

See also: List of playwrights; List of early-modern British women playwrights; Lists of writers

Albania
See also: List of Albanian writers
(1850–1904) Sami Frashëri

Assyria
See also: List of Assyrian writers
(born 1965) Rosie Malek-Yonan
(born 1969) Monica Malek-Yonan

Australia
(1799–1873) Henry Melville
(1813–1868) Charles Harpur
(1822–1878) William Akhurst 
(1842–1880) Walter Cooper
(1843–1913) Garnet Walch
(1843–1908) Alfred Dampier
(1846–1881) Marcus Clarke
(1846–1918) Mary Foott 
(1860–1921) Charles Haddon Spurgeon Chambers
(1865–1944) Alex Melrose
(1867–1905) Guy Boothby
(1869–1942) George Beeby
(1873–1953) Dora Wilcox
(1877–1946) Harry Tighe
(1878–1943) Louis Esson
(1865–1935) Carlton Dawe
(1881–1917) Sumner Locke 
(1884–1946) Walter J. Turner
(1888–1954) Lionel Shave 
(1894–1918) Adrian Consett Stephen 
(1906–1954) Malcolm Afford
(1912–1988) Kylie Tennant
(1916–1999) Morris West
(1917–2000) Jack Davis
(born 1921) Ray Lawler
(1923–2002) Dorothy Hewett
(1927–2015) Alan Seymour
(born 1933) Wendy Richardson
(born 1941) Kenneth G. Ross
(born 1942) David Williamson
(1944–2006) Alex Buzo
(1948–1997) Roger Bennett
(1948–2017) Jimmy Chi
(1950–2003) Nick Enright
(born 1950) Louis Nowra
(born 1953) Justin Fleming
(born 1955) Michael Gow
(born 1959) Richard Frankland
(born 1960) Jane Harrison
(1964–1989) Bill Neskovski
(born 1969) Wesley Enoch
(born 1978) Van Badham
(born 1978) Lally Katz
(born 1978) Tom Taylor

Austria
See also: List of German-language playwrights; List of German-language authors; List of Austrian writers
(1791–1872) Franz Grillparzer
(1801–1862) Johann Nestroy
(1814–1874) Friedrich Kaiser
(1839–1889) Ludwig Anzengruber
(1863–1934) Hermann Bahr
(1866–1945) Richard Beer-Hofmann
(1874–1929) Hugo von Hofmannsthal
(1874–1936) Karl Kraus
(1880–1942) Robert Musil
(1885–1969) Franz Theodor Csokor
(1886–1980) Oskar Kokoschka
(1891–1958) Ferdinand Bruckner
(1895–1959) Arnolt Bronnen
(1897–1976) Alexander Lernet-Holenia
(1901–1938) Ödön von Horváth
(1911–1986) Fritz Hochwälder
(1921–1988) Erich Fried
(1941–2005) Wolfgang Bauer
(born 1942) Peter Handke
(born 1944) Peter Turrini

Azerbaijan
See also: List of Azerbaijani dramatists and playwrights
(1854–1926) Najaf bey Vazirov
(1865–1927) Sakina Akhundzadeh
(1870–1930) Abdurrahim bey Hagverdiyev
(1872–1950) Mammed Said Ordubadi
(1874–1918) Abbas Sahhat
(1875–1939) Suleyman Sani Akhundov
(1879–1945) Huseyngulu Sarabski
(1882–1941) Huseyn Javid
(1899–1934) Jafar Jabbarly
(1910–1981) Rasul Rza
(1911–1993) Mirza Ibrahimov
(1913–1981) Nigar Rafibeyli
(born 1927) Vidadi Babanli
(1935–2016) Magsud Ibrahimbeyov
(born 1937) Hamid Arzulu
(born 1938) Anar Rzayev
(born 1949) Natig Rasulzadeh
(born 1957) Afag Masud

Bangladesh
(1925–1971) Munir Chowdhury
(1942–2008) Abdullah Al Mamun
(1903–1971) Momtazuddin Ahmed
(born 1948) Mamunur Rashid
(1949–2008) Selim Al Deen

Belarus
(1880–1948) Peretz Hirschbein
(1888–1962) H. Leivick

Belgium
(1862–1949) Maurice Maeterlinck
(1885–1970) Fernand Crommelynck
(1898–1962) Michel de Ghelderode
(1913–2012) Félicien Marceau
(1945–1999) Michèle Fabien
(born 1960) Éric-Emmanuel Schmitt

Bosnia and Herzegovina
(born 1955) Zlatko Topčić
(born 1944) Abdulah Sidran
(1950–2015) Safet Plakalo
(born 1962) Nenad Veličković

Brazil
(1815–1848) Martins Pena
(1831–1852) Álvares de Azevedo
(1839–1908) Machado de Assis
(1857–1913) Aluísio Azevedo
(1912–1980) Nelson Rodrigues
(1923–2012) Millôr Fernandes
(1927–2014) Ariano Suassuna
(1931–2009) Augusto Boal
(1948–1996) Caio Fernando Abreu

Canada
See also: List of Canadian playwrights; List of Canadian writers; List of Quebec writers; List of French Canadian writers from outside Quebec; List of Canadian plays
(1893–1975) Merrill Denison
(1909–1999) Gratien Gélinas
(1913–1995) Robertson Davies
(1930–2016) Marcel Dubé
(born 1961) Vittorio Rossi
(born 1964) David Gow

Czech Republic
See also: List of Czech writers
(1884–1968) Max Brod
(1889–1942) Paul Kornfeld 
(1890–1938) Karel Čapek
(1936–2011) Václav Havel

Denmark
See also: List of Danish authors
(1684–1754) Ludvig Holberg
(1779–1850) Adam Gottlob Oehlenschläger
(1791–1860) Johan Ludvig Heiberg
(1797–1870) Henrik Hertz
(1898–1944) Kaj Munk
(1901–1961) Kjeld Abell

Egypt
(1835–1902) Abu Khalil Qabbani

Estonia
(1751–1792) Jakob Lenz

France
See also: List of French playwrights; List of French language authors
(died c. 1210) Jean Bodel
(c. 1237–c. 1288) Adam de la Halle
(c. 1470/80–c. 1538/39) Pierre Gringoire
(1532–1573) Étienne Jodelle
(c. 1535–c. 1607) Jean de La Taille
(1540–1619) Pierre de Larivey
(1544–1590) Robert Garnier
(c. 1570–1632) Alexandre Hardy
(1595–1676) Jean Desmaretz de Saint-Sorlin
(1601–1667) Georges de Scudéry
(1604–1686) Jean Mairet
(1606–1658) Pierre Du Ryer
(1606–1684) Pierre Corneille
(1622–1673) Molière
(1625–1709) Thomas Corneille
(1635–1688) Philippe Quinault
(1638–1701) Edme Boursault
(1639–1699) Jean Racine
(1640–1723) David-Augustin de Brueys
(1650–1721) Jean Palaprat
(1654–1724) Charles Rivière Dufresny
(1659–1741) Augustin Nadal
(1661–1725) Florent Carton Dancourt
(1668–1747) Alain-René Lesage
(1674–1762) Prosper Jolyot de Crébillon
(1680–1754) Philippe Néricault Destouches
(1688–1763) Pierre Carlet de Marivaux
(1692–1754) Pierre-Claude Nivelle de La Chaussée
(1694–1778) Voltaire
(1709–1777) Jean-Baptiste Louis Gresset
(1713–1784) Denis Diderot
(1732–1799) Pierre de Beaumarchais
(1740–1814) Louis-Sébastien Mercier
(1750–1794) Philippe François Nazaire Fabre d'Églantine
(1793–1843) Casimir-Jean-François Delavigne
(1798–1855) Adam Mickiewicz
(1799–1850) Honoré de Balzac
(1802–1870) Alexandre Dumas, père
(1802–1885) Victor Hugo
(1804–1876) George Sand
(1805–1882) Henri Auguste Barbier
(1810–1857) Alfred de Musset
(1811–1899) Adolphe Philippe d'Ennery
(1812–1859) Zygmunt Krasiński
(1815–1888) Eugène Marin Labiche
(1820–1889) Émile Augier
(1823–1891) Théodore de Banville
(1824–1895) Alexandre Dumas, fils
(1831–1897) Henri Meilhac
(1834–1908) Ludovic Halévy
(1837–1899) Henry Becque
(1840–1897) Alphonse Daudet
(1842–1908) François Coppée
(1848–1912) Alexandre Bisson
(1848–1917) Octave Mirbeau
(1848–1918) Georges Ohnet
(1853–1914) Jules Lemaître
(1854–1928) François de Curel
(1857–1915) Paul Hervieu
(1858–1922) Alfred Capus
(1858–1929) Georges Courteline
(1858–1932) Eugène Brieux
(1859–1940) Henri Lavedan
(1859–1945) Maurice Donnay
(1861–1949) Lucien Descaves
(1862–1921) Georges Feydeau
(1862–1949) Maurice Maeterlinck
(1866–1947) Tristan Bernard
(1868–1918) Edmond Rostand
(1868–1955) Paul Claudel
(1869–1915) Gaston de Caillavet
(1869–1955) Émile Fabre
(1872–1922) Henri Bataille
(1872–1927) Robert de Flers
(1873–1907) Alfred Jarry
(1875–1937) Henri Duvernois
(1875–1944) Henri Ghéon
(1876–1953) Henri Bernstein
(1877–1937) Francis de Croisset
(1879–1949) Jacques Copeau
(1880–1918) Guillaume Apollinaire
(1881–1958) Roger Martin du Gard
(1882–1941) James Joyce
(1882–1944) Jean Giraudoux
(1882–1951) Henri-René Lenormand
(1882–1962) René Fauchois
(1884–1973) Alexandre Arnoux
(1885–1957) Sacha Guitry
(1885–1970) François Mauriac
(1886–1970) Fernand Crommelynck
(1887–1945) Édouard Bourdet
(1888–1972) Jean-Jacques Bernard
(1889–1963) Jean Cocteau
(1889–1973) Gabriel Marcel
(1890–1974) André Birabeau
(1892–1975) André Obey
(1894–1972) Jacques Deval
(1895–1970) Jean Giono
(1896–1948) Antonin Artaud
(1896–1972) Henry de Montherlant
(1899–1965) Jacques Audiberti
(1899–1974) Marcel Achard
(1900–1982) Georges Neveux
(1900–1998) Julien Green
(1902–1967) Marcel Aymé
(1905–1980) Jean-Paul Sartre
(1906–1989) Samuel Beckett
(1908–1970) Arthur Adamov
(1909–1988) Thierry Maulnier
(1909–1994) Eugène Ionesco
(1910–1986) Jean Genet
(1910–1987) Jean Anouilh
(1912–1998) Félix Morisseau-Leroy
(1913–1960) Albert Camus
(1913–2012) Félicien Marceau
(1914–1996) Marguerite Duras
(1917–1987) Georges Arnaud
(1920–2011) Jean Dutourd
(1924–2017) Armand Gatti
(1927–1991) François Billetdoux
(1930–2013) Sławomir Mrożek

Georgia
See also: List of Georgian writers
(1802–1869) Alexander Orbeliani
(1813–1864) Giorgi Eristavi
(1824–1901) Raphael Eristavi
(1862–1931) David Kldiashvili
(1882–1962) Grigol Robakidze
(1904–1938) Gerzel Baazov
(born 1977) Lasha Bugadze
(born 1980) Nestan Kvinikadze

Germany
See also: List of German-language playwrights; List of German-language authors
(1616–1664) Andreas Gryphius
(1700–1766) Johann Christoph Gottsched
(1724–1803) Friedrich Gottlieb Klopstock
(1729–1781) Gotthold Ephraim Lessing
(1737–1823) Heinrich Wilhelm von Gerstenberg
(1749–1825) Maler Müller
(1749–1832) Johann Wolfgang von Goethe
(1751–1792) Jakob Lenz
(1752–1806) Johann Anton Leisewitz
(1752–1831) Friedrich Maximilian von Klinger
(1759–1805) Friedrich Schiller
(1759–1814) August Wilhelm Iffland
(1761–1819) August von Kotzebue
(1770–1843) Friedrich Hölderlin
(1774–1829) Amandus Gottfried Adolf Müllner
(1777–1811) Heinrich von Kleist
(1788–1857) Baron Joseph von Eichendorff
(1796–1840) Karl Immermann
(1801–1836) Christian Dietrich Grabbe
(1806–1884) Heinrich Laube
(1811–1878) Karl Ferdinand Gutzkow
(1813–1837) Georg Büchner
(1813–1863) Friedrich Hebbel
(1813–1865) Otto Ludwig
(1816–1895) Gustav Freytag
(1839–1911) Martin Greif
(1862–1946) Gerhart Hauptmann
(1865–1944) Max Halbe
(1866–1933) Paul Ernst
(1870–1938) Ernst Barlach
(1876–1947) Ernst Hardt
(1878–1945) Georg Kaiser
(1882–1961) Leonhard Frank
(1884–1958) Lion Feuchtwanger
(1886–1969) Johannes von Guenther
(1887–1945) Bruno Frank
(1888–1960) Curt Goetz
(1889–1942) Paul Kornfeld
(1890–1940) Walter Hasenclever
(1894–1959) Hans Henny Jahnn
(1895–1952) Alfred Neumann
(1898–1956) Bertolt Brecht
(1901–1938) Ödön von Horváth
(1906–1970) Stefan Andres
(1906–1972) Eberhard Wolfgang Möller
(1910–1990) Ulrich Becher
(1916–1991) Wolfgang Hildesheimer
(1921–1947) Wolfgang Borchert
(1925–2017) Tankred Dorst
(1927–2015) Günter Grass
(1928–2003) Peter Hacks
(1931–2020) Rolf Hochhuth

Ghana
(1912–1998) Félix Morisseau-Leroy
(1924–1978) Joe de Graft
(1924–1996) Efua Sutherland
(born 1942) Ama Ata Aidoo
(born 1946) Asiedu Yirenkyi

Greece
See also: List of Greek artists
(c. 525 BC–c. 456 BC) Aeschylus
(c. 495 BC–c. 406 BC) Sophocles
(c. 485 BC–c. 406 BC) Euripides
(c. 448 BC–c. 400 BC) Agathon
(c. 445 BC–c. 385 BC) Aristophanes
(c. 343 BC–c. 290 BC) Menander

Haiti
(1912–1998) Félix Morisseau-Leroy

Hungary
See also: List of Hungarian writers
(1747–1811) György Bessenyei
(1773–1885) Mihály Csokonai Vitéz
(1786–1839) Izidor Guzmics
(1788–1830) Károly Kisfaludy
(1791–1830) József Katona
(1800–1855) Mihály Vörösmarty
(1800–1866) Gergely Czuczor
(1814–1878) Ede Szigligeti
(1823–1864) Imre Madách
(1842–1891) Gergely Csíky
(1845–1918) Lajos Dóczi
(1863–1954) Ferenc Herczeg
(1869–1944) Dezső Szomory
(1878–1952) Ferenc Molnár
(1880–1974) Melchior Lengyel
(1888–1967) Lajos Egri
(1890–1942) Sándor Hunyady
(1900–1975) Gyula Háy
(1901–1938) Ödön von Horváth
(1901–1975) László Németh
(1902–1983) Gyula Illyés
(1912–1979) István Örkény
(1917–2007) Magda Szabó
(1927–2006) András Sütő
(1930–1989) Erzsébet Galgóczi
(1932–2002) János Nyíri
(1934–2012) István Csurka
(born 1934) György Moldova
(born 1942) Péter Nádas
(1943–2010) György Schwajda
(born 1946) György Spiró
(born 1950) Miklós Vámos
(born 1953) Lajos Parti Nagy
(born 1960) Zsolt Pozsgai

India
(1861–1941) Rabindranath Tagore
(1938–2019) Girish Karnad

Iran
(born 1938) Bahram Bayzai
(1939–2007) Akbar Radi
(born 1952) Rosie Malek-Yonan
(born 1954) Monica Malek-Yonan

Iraq
(1867–1950) Pîremêrd

Ireland
See also: List of Irish dramatists; List of writers from Northern Ireland
(1728–1774) Oliver Goldsmith
(1735–1812) Isaac Bickerstaffe
(1784–1862) James Sheridan Knowles
(c. 1820–1890) Dion Boucicault
(1852–1932) Lady Gregory
(1852–1933) George Moore
(1853–1923) William Boyle
(1854–1900) Oscar Wilde
(1856–1950) George Bernard Shaw
(1859–1923) Edward Martyn
(1860–1949) Douglas Hyde
(1865–1939) W.B. Yeats
(1871–1909) John Millington Synge
(1873–1956) James Cousins
(1873–1959) T. C. Murray
(1874–1949) Tadhg Ó Donnchadha 
(1876–1913) Fred Ryan 
(1877–1963) George Fitzmaurice
(1878–1916) Thomas MacDonagh
(1878–1957) Edward Plunkett, 18th Baron of Dunsany Lord Dunsany
(1880–1964) Seán O'Casey
(1881–1972) Padraic Colum
(1882–1941) James Joyce
(1883–1971) St. John Ervine
(1886–1958) Lennox Robinson
(1890–1963) Brinsley MacNamara
(1899–1978) Micheál MacLíammóir
(1900–1968) Paul Vincent Carroll
(1901–1984) Denis Johnston
(1902–1961) Edward Pakenham, 6th Earl of Longford
(1906–1989) Samuel Beckett
(1910–2001) Joseph O'Conor
(1912–1968) Donagh MacDonagh
(1923–1964) Brendan Behan
(1926–2009) Hugh Leonard
(1928–2002) John B. Keane
(1929–2015) Brian Friel
(born 1934) Thomas Kilroy
(1935–2018) Tom Murphy
(born 1949) Billy Roche 
(born 1952) Peter Sheridan
(born 1953) Frank McGuinness
(born 1964) Marina Carr
(born 1967) Enda Walsh
(born 1971) Conor McPherson
(born 1971) Jimmy Murphy

Israel
See also: List of Hebrew language playwrights; List of Hebrew language authors
(1884–1968) Max Brod
(1900–1973) Avraham Shlonsky
(1910–1970) Nathan Alterman
(1924–2005) Ephraim Kishon
(1926–1998) Nisim Aloni
(born 1935) Dan Almagor
(born 1936) A. B. Yehoshua
(born 1939) Yehoshua Sobol
(1943–1999) Hanoch Levin
(born 1954) Shmuel Hasfari

Italy
See also: List of Italian writers
(c. 1230–1306) Jacopone da Todi
(1261–1329) Albertino Mussato
(1469–1527) Niccolò Machiavelli
(1470–1520) Bernardo Dovizio da Bibbiena
(1474–1533) Ludovico Ariosto
(1492–1556) Pietro Aretino
(1492–1573) Donato Giannotti
(1503–1584) Anton Francesco Grazzini
(1504–1573) Giambattista Giraldi Cinthio
(1507–1566) Annibale Caro
(1508–c. 1568) Ludovico Dolce
(c. 1525–c. 1586) Giovanni Battista Cini
(1535–1615) Giambattista Della Porta
(1538–1612) Gian Battista Guarini
(1541–1585) Luigi Groto
(1548–1600) Giordano Bruno
(1568–1642) Michelangelo Buonarroti the Younger
(1576–1654) Giovan Battista Andreini
(1675–1755) Francesco Scipione, marchese di Maffei
(1698–1782) Pietro Metastasio
(1707–1793) Carlo Goldoni
(1712–1785) Pietro Chiari
(1720–1806) Carlo Gozzi
(1728–1787) Ferdinando Galiani
(1749–1803) Vittorio Alfieri
(1754–1828) Vincenzo Monti
(1776–1834) Giovanni Giraud
(1778–1827) Ugo Foscolo
(1785–1873) Alessandro Manzoni
(1800–1846) Carlo Marenco
(1816–1882) Paolo Giacometti
(1822–1889) Paolo Ferrari
(1830–1881) Pietro Cossa
(1839–1915) Luigi Capuana
(1842–1911) Antonio Fogazzaro
(1847–1906) Giuseppe Giacosa
(1852–1909) Alfredo Oriani
(1860–1934) Salvatore Di Giacomo
(1861–1943) Roberto Bracco
(1863–1938) Gabriele D'Annunzio
(1867–1927) Augusto Novelli
(1867–1936) Luigi Pirandello
(1874–1934) Dario Niccodemi
(1876–1944) Filippo Tommaso Marinetti
(1877–1949) Sem Benelli
(1878–1960) Massimo Bontempelli
(1880–1918) Guillaume Apollinaire
(1880–1947) Luigi Chiarelli
(1882–1921) Ercole Luigi Morselli
(1892–1953) Ugo Betti
(1898–1992) Valentino Bompiani
(1900–1984) Eduardo De Filippo
(1907–1954) Vitaliano Brancati
(1911–1980) Diego Fabbri
(1911–2007) Gian Carlo Menotti
(1916-1991) Natalia Ginzburg
(1922–1975) Pier Paolo Pasolini
(1926–2016) Dario Fo

Japan
See also: List of Japanese writers
(1363–1443) Seami Motokiyo Zeami}
(1653–1725) Chikamatsu Monzaemon

Kurdistan
(1867–1950) Pîremêrd

Latvia
(1751–1792) Jakob Lenz

Lithuania
(1882–1957) Antanas Vienuolis
(1882–1954) Vincas Krėvė-Mickevičius
(1893–1967) Vincas Mykolaitis-Putinas
(1910–1961) Antanas Škėma
(1930–2011) Justinas Marcinkevičius
(born 1950) Ričardas Gavelis

Macedonia
(1964–1989) Blagoje "Bill" Neskovski

Mexico
(born 1973) Conchi León

Morocco
See also: List of Moroccan writers
(1938–2009) Abdelkebir Khatibi
(1938–2016) Tayeb Seddiki
(born 1953) Abdallah Zrika

Nepal
See also: List of Nepali writers
(1903–1981) Balkrishna Sama
(1909–1959) Laxmi Prasad Devkota
(born 1945) Abhi Subedi
(born 1967) Suman Pokhrel

Netherlands
See also: List of Dutch language writers
(1454–1507)? Peter van Diest
(1487–1558) Macropedius
(1522–1590) Dirck Coornhert
(1579–1665) Samuel Coster
(1581–1647) Pieter Corneliszoon Hooft
(1584–1635) Willem van Nieulandt II
(1585–1618) Gerbrand Bredero
(1587–1679) Joost van den Vondel
(1601–1646) Jan Harmenszoon Krul
(1612–1667) Jan Vos
(1629–1681) Lodewijk Meyer
(1631–1669) Catharina Questiers
(1639–1672) Joan Blasius
(1640–1670) Willem Godschalck van Focquenbroch
(1640–1709) Pieter Nuyts
(1649–1713) Govert Bidloo
(1664–1721)  Abraham Alewijn
(1682–1729) Maria de Wilde
(1683–1756) Pieter Langendijk
(1688–1727) Hermanus Angelkot Jr.
(1759–1837) Jan van Walré
(1854-1938) August Kiehl
(1864–1924) Herman Heijermans
(1869–1952) Henriette Roland Holst
(1871-1964) Jan Fabricius
(1872–1929) Inte Onsman
(1878–1942) Rudolf Besier
(1882-1937) Henri van Wermeskerken
(1891–1966) Watse Cuperus
(1893–1989) Abel Herzberg
(1896–1962) Maurits Dekker
(1911–1995) Annie M. G. Schmidt
(1912–1993) Max Croiset
(1918–1992) Hans Heyting
(1927–2010) Harry Mulisch
(born 1934) Judith Herzberg
(born 1938) Thea Doelwijt
(1939–2014) Seth Gaaikema
(1943–1995) Ischa Meijer
(1944–2012) Gerrit Komrij
(born 1946) Adriaan van Dis
(born 1946) Paul Haenen
(born 1946) Wim T. Schippers
(born 1951) Willem Jan Otten
(born 1952) Alex van Warmerdam
(born 1952) Vonne van der Meer
(born 1954) Youp van 't Hek
(born 1956) Arjan Ederveen
(born 1971) Arnon Grunberg

Nigeria
(born 1934) Wole Soyinka
(1941–1995) Ken Saro-Wiwa
(born 1948) Bode Sowande
(born 1964) Sefi Atta
(1967–2022) Biyi Bandele

Norway
See also: List of Norwegian writers
(1684–1754) Ludvig Holberg
(1828–1906) Henrik Ibsen
(1832–1910) Bjornstjerne Bjornson
(1857–1929) Gunnar Heiberg
(1889–1962) Helge Krog
(1902–1943) Nordahl Grieg

Pakistan

(1914–1999) Mirza Adeeb
(born 1941) Haseena Moin

Poland
See also: List of Polish language authors
(1616–1664) Andreas Gryphius
(1793–1876) Aleksander Fredro
(1798–1855) Adam Mickiewicz
(c. 1800–c. 1855) Solomon Ettinger
(1809–1849) Juliusz Słowacki
(1811–1899) Abraham Dov Ber Gotlober
(1812–1859) Zygmunt Krasiński
(1820–1869) Apollo Korzeniowski
(1860–1921) Gabriela Zapolska
(1868–1927) Stanisław Przybyszewski
(1869–1907) Stanisław Wyspiański
(1874–1915) Jerzy Żuławski
(1880–1957) Sholem Asch
(1885–1939) Stanisław Ignacy Witkiewicz (Witkacy)
(1904–1969) Witold Gombrowicz
(1920–2005) Karol Wojtyła (Pope John Paul II)
(1930–2013) Sławomir Mrożek
(1938–2017) Janusz Głowacki
(1989) Weronika Murek

Portugal
See also: List of Portuguese language authors
(1465–1536) Gil Vicente
(1799–1854) João Batista de Almeida Garrett
(1906–1997) António Gedeão
(1922–2010) José Saramago

Romania
See also: List of Romanian playwrights and List of Romanian writers
(1821–1890) Vasile Alecsandri
(1840–1908) Abraham Haim Lipke Goldfaden
(1852–1912) Ion Luca Caragiale
(1858–1918) Barbu Delavrancea
(1909–1994) Eugène Ionesco

Russia
See also: List of Russian language writers
(c. 1745–1792) Denis Ivanovich Fonvizin
(1751–1792) Jakob Lenz
(1752–1831) Friedrich Maximilian von Klinger
(1795–1829) Aleksandr Sergeyevich Griboyedov
(1809–1852) Nikolay Vasilyevich Gogol
(1814–1841) Mikhail Yuryevich Lermontov
(1823–1886) Aleksandr Nikolayevich Ostrovsky
(1856–1909) Innokenty Fyodorovich Annensky
(1860–1904) Anton Pavlovich Chekhov
(1863–1920) S. Anski
(1868–1936) Maxim Gorky
(1871–1919) Leonid Nikolayevich Andreyev
(1880–1921) Aleksandr Aleksandrovich Blok
(1880–1948) Peretz Hirschbein
(1888–1962) H. Leivick
(1891–1940) Mikhail Afanasyevich Bulgakov
(1893–1930) Vladimir Vladimirovich Mayakovsky
(1894–1941) Isaak Emmanuilovich Babel
(1895–1963) Vsevolod Vyacheslavovich Ivanov
(1897–1986) Valentin Petrovich Katayev
(1899–1994) Leonid Maksimovich Leonov
(1904–1941) Aleksandr Nikolayevich Afinogenov

Senegal
(1912–1998) Félix Morisseau-Leroy

Serbia
(1791–1847) Sima Milutinović Sarajlija
(1793–1830) Georgije Magarašević
(1806–1956) Jovan Sterija Popović
(1818–1903) Matija Ban
(1832–1878) Đura Jakšić
(1843–1875) Kosta Trifković
(1847–1908) Milovan Glišić
(1858–1926) Dragutin Ilić
(1864–1938) Branislav Nušić
(1884–1968) Vojislav Jovanović Marambo
(1886–1974) Velimir Živojinović Massuka
(1887–1952) Mir-Jam
(1888–1969) Toma Smiljanić-Bradina
(1895–1976) Vladimir Velmar-Janković
(1900–1924) Dušan Vasiljev
(1924–1989) Mira Trailović
(1928–2009) Danko Popović
(1929–2009) Milorad Pavić
(1930–1992) Borislav Pekić
(1933–2014) Svetlana Velmar-Janković
(1938) Gordan Mihić
(1938) Svetozar Vlajković
(1940) Filip David
(1940) Miodrag Novaković
(1941–1991) Milan Milišić
(1941) Vida Ognjenović
(1948) Zorica Jevremović
(1948) Dušan Kovačević
(1948–2021) Bratislav Petković
(1948) Božidar Zečević
(1950) Stojan Srdić
(1951–2015) Mladen Dražetin
(1954) Siniša Kovačević
(1954) Radoslav Pavlović
(1959) Branislav Pipović
(1969) Đorđe Milosavljević 
(1969) Zoran Stefanović
(1970) Branislava Ilić

Slovenia
See also: List of Slovenian playwrights
(1831–1887) Fran Levstik
(1871–1962) Fran Saleški Finžgar
(1876–1918) Ivan Cankar
(1878–1949) Oton Župančič
(1930–1987) Gregor Strniša
(born 1948) Drago Jančar

Spain
See also: List of Spanish language authors
(c. 1469–1530) Juan del Encina
(1474–1542) Lucas Fernández
(1547–1616) Miguel de Cervantes
(c. 1550–1610) Juan de la Cueva
(1562–1635) Lope de Vega
(1569–1631) Guillén de Castro y Bellvís
(1569–c. 1644) Feliciana Enríquez de Guzmán
(c. 1574–1644) Antonio Mira de Amescua
(c. 1575–1648) Tirso de Molina
(1587–1650) Luis de Belmonte y Bermúdez
(1596–1661) Álvaro Cubillo de Aragón
(1600–1681) Pedro Calderón de la Barca
(1611–1652) Antonio Coello y Ochoa
(1618–1669) Agustín Moreto y Cabaña
(1622–1714) Juan Claudio de la Hoz y Mota
(1625–1687) Juan Bautista Diamante
(1662–1704) Francisco Antonio Bances y López-Candamo
(1676–1750) José de Cañizares
(1731–1794) Ramón de la Cruz
(1734–1787) Vicente Antonio García de la Huerta
(1737–1780) Nicolás Fernández de Moratín
(1760–1828) Leandro Fernández de Moratín
(1787–1862) Francisco Martínez de la Rosa
(1793–1861) Antonio Gil y Zárate
(1796–1873) Manuel Bretón de los Herreros
(1806–1880) Juan Eugenio Hartzenbusch y Martínez
(1809–1837) Mariano José de Larra y Sánchez de Castro
(1813–1884) Antonio García Gutiérrez
(1828–1879) Adelardo López de Ayala y Herrera
(1832–1916) José Echegaray
(1834–1903) Gaspar Núñez de Arce
(1863–1917) Joaquín Dicenta y Benedicto
(1866–1936) Ramón del Valle-Inclán
(1866–1943) Carlos Arniches y Barrera
(1866–1954) Jacinto Benavente
(1871–1938) Serafín Álvarez Quintero
(1873–1944) Joaquín Álvarez Quintero
(1874–1947) Manuel Machado
(1875–1939) Antonio Machado
(1877–1958) Jacinto Grau Delgado
(1879–1946) Eduardo Marquina
(1881–1936) Pedro Muñoz Seca
(1881–1947) Gregorio Martínez Sierra
(1897–1975) Juan Ignacio Luca de Tena
(1898–1936) Federico García Lorca
(1899–1967) Edgar Neville
(1901–1952) Enrique Jardiel Poncela
(1902–1999) Rafael Alberti
(1903–1965) Alejandro Casona
(1903–1996) José López Rubio
(1905–1977) Miguel Mihura Santos
(1916–2000) Antonio Buero Vallejo
(born 1932) Fernando Arrabal
(born 1943) Alfonso Vallejo

Catalonia
See also: List of Catalan-language writers
(1845–1924) Àngel Guimerà

Sweden
See also: List of Swedish language writers
(1849–1912) August Strindberg
(1883–1931) Hjalmar Bergman
(1891–1974) Pär Lagerkvist
(1918–1997) Werner Aspenström
(1923–1954) Stig Dagerman
(1928–2007) Lars Forssell
Ninna Tinsman

Switzerland
(1882–1941) James Joyce
(1886–1980) Oskar Kokoschka
(1911–1986) Fritz Hochwälder
(1911–1991) Max Frisch
(1921–1990) Friedrich Dürrenmatt

Syria
(1835–1902) Abu Khalil Qabbani

Turkey
(1850–1904) Sami Frashëri
(1867–1950) Pîremêrd
(born 1986) Hayati Citaklar

Ukraine
(1811–1899) Abraham Dov Ber Gotlober
(1840–1908) Abraham Haim Lipke Goldfaden
(1853–1909) Jacob Gordin
(1871–1913) Lesya Ukrainka
(born 1971) Eugenia Chuprina

United Kingdom
See also: List of British playwrights; British playwrights since 1950; List of early-modern British women playwrights

England
See also: List of English writers
(c. 1460–1502) Henry Medwall
(1495–1563) John Bale
(c. 1497–c. 1585) John Heywood
(1532–1584) Thomas Norton
(1535–1577) George Gascoigne
(c. 1553–1606) John Lyly
(1558–1592) Robert Greene
(1558–1594) Thomas Kyd
(c. 1560–1634) George Chapman
(1563–1631) Michael Drayton
(1564–1593) Christopher Marlowe
(1564–1616) William Shakespeare
(c. 1570–1641) Thomas Heywood
(c. 1572–1632) Thomas Dekker
(1572–1637) Ben Jonson
(1576–1634) John Marston
(1579–1625) John Fletcher
(1580–1627) Thomas Middleton
(1583–1640) Philip Massinger
(c. 1585–1616) Francis Beaumont
(c. 1585–after 1639) John Ford
(c. 1590–c. 1653) Richard Brome
(1606–1668) William Davenant
(1631–1700) John Dryden
(c. 1635–1691) George Etherege
(1640–1689) Aphra Behn
(c. 1640–c. 1703) John Crowne
(1652–1685) Thomas Otway
(c. 1653–1692) Nathaniel Lee
(c. 1667–1723) Susannah Centlivre
(1670–1729) William Congreve
(1671–1757) Colley Cibber
(1672–1719) Joseph Addison
(c. 1678–1707) George Farquhar
(1685–1732) John Gay
(1693–1739) George Lillo
(c. 1700–1766) William Rufus Chetwood
(1707–1754) Henry Fielding
(1717–1779) David Garrick
(1720–1777) Samuel Foote
(1728–1774) Oliver Goldsmith
(1732–1794) George Colman the Elder
(1732–1811) Richard Cumberland
(born 1773) Anna Ross
(1784–1862) James Sheridan Knowles
(1788–1824) George Gordon Byron, 6th Baron Byron (Lord Byron)
(1792–1847) Richard Brinsley Peake
(1794–1857) William Thomas Moncrieff
(1803–1857) Douglas William Jerrold
(1803–1873) Edward Bulwer-Lytton, 1st Baron Lytton
(before 1810–after 1838) Elizabeth Polack
(1817–1880) Tom Taylor
(1812–1889) Robert Browning
(1814–1884) Charles Reade
(1836–1911) W. S. Gilbert
(1843–1916) Henry James
(1848–1914) Sydney Grundy
(1851–1929) Henry Arthur Jones
(1852–1932) Lady Augusta Gregory (Lady Gregory)
(1853–1931) Hall Caine
(1859–1927) Jerome K. Jerome
(1860–1917) Florence Farr
(1860–1937) Sir James Matthew Barrie
(1865–1948) Alfred Edward Woodley Mason
(1865–1959) Laurence Housman
(1866–1945) Mrs Henry de la Pasture
(1867–1931) Arnold Bennett
(1867–1933) John Galsworthy
(1868–1946) Herbert Swears
(1869–1909) St. John Emile Clavering Hankin
(1877–1946) Harley Granville-Barker
(1878–1942) Rudolph Besier
(1878–1957) Edward Plunkett, 18th Baron of Dunsany (Lord Dunsany)
(1878–1967) John Masefield
(1881–1913) William Stanley Houghton
(1881–1954) Frederick Lonsdale
(1882–1937) John Drinkwater
(1882–1956) A. A. Milne
(1882–1958) Harold Brighouse
(1883–1971) St. John Ervine
(1884–1915) James Elroy Flecker
(1886–1962) Clifford Bax
(1886–1980) Oskar Kokoschka
(1888–1965) Clemence Dane
(1888–1965) T. S. Eliot
(1889–1946) John Colton
(1890–1976) Agatha Christie
(1893–1951) Ivor Novello
(1893–1964) Will Scott
(1894–1984) J. B. Priestley
(1896–1967) Margaret Kennedy
(1896–1975) R. C. Sherriff
(1899–1973) Noël Coward
(1900–1973) Benn W. Levy
(1901–1984) Denis Johnston
(1902–1961) Edward Pakenham, 6th Earl of Longford
(1904–1986) Christopher Isherwood
(1904–1991) Graham Greene
(1907–1973) W. H. Auden
(1907–2005) Christopher Fry
(1911–1977) Terence Rattigan
(1921–1988) Erich Fried
(1923–2009) John Mortimer
(1924–1995) Robert Bolt
(1924–2006) David Campton
(1924-2009) Royce Ryton
(1925–1994) Alun Owen
(1926–1999) Jim Allen
(1926–2001) Anthony Shaffer
(1926–2016) Peter Shaffer
(1927–2017) Ann Jellicoe
(1927–2019) Peter Nichols
(1928–1996) Frank Marcus
(1929–1994) John Osborne
(1929–1998) Henry Livings
(1930–2008) Harold Pinter
(1930–2012) John Arden
(1933–1967) Joe Orton
(born 1933) Michael Frayn
(born 1934) Alan Bennett
(born 1934) Edward Bond
(born 1934) Wole Soyinka
(1936–2008) Simon Gray
(born 1937) Tom Stoppard
(1938–2011) Shelagh Delaney
(born 1939) Alan Ayckbourn
(1945–2019) Barrie Keeffe
(born 1942) Howard Brenton
(born 1947) David Hare
(born 1957) Sue Lenier
(1971–1999) Sarah Kane
(born 1974) Leo Butler

Scotland
See also: List of Scottish dramatists
(c. 1490–c. 1555) David Lyndsay
(1860–1937) J. M. Barrie
(1888–1951) James Bridie
(1900–1968) Paul Vincent Carroll
(1907–1985) Robert McLellan
(1912–2006) Ena Lamont Stewart
(1918–1978) Joan Ure
(born 1951) Peter May

Wales
See also: List of Welsh writers
(1893–1951) Ivor Novello
(1925–1994) Alun Owen
(1893–1985) Saunders Lewis

United States
See also: List of playwrights from the United States; List of African-American writers; List of Jewish American playwrights
(1766–1839) William Dunlap
(1784–1842) Samuel Woodworth
(1784–1858) James Nelson Barker
(1793–1876) John Neal
(1806–1854) Robert Montgomery Bird
(1810–1858) Robert Taylor Conrad
(1819–1870) Anna Cora Mowatt
(c. 1820–1890) Dion Boucicault
(1823–1890) George H. Boker
(1830–1876) George Aiken
(1837–1920) William Dean Howells
(1838–1899) Augustin Daly
(1839–1901) James A. Herne
(1840–1908) Abraham Haim Lipke Goldfaden
(1842–1894) Steele MacKaye
(1842–1908) Bronson Howard
(1843–1916) Henry James
(1845–1911) Edward Harrigan
(1853–1909) Jacob Gordin
(1853–1931) David Belasco
(1855–1937) William Gillette
(1856–1932 or later) Cora Scott Pond Pope
(1856-1938) Eva Allen Alberti
(1862–1935) Langdon Mitchell
(1865–1909) Clyde Fitch
(1866–1935) George Pierce Baker
(1866–1944) George Ade
(1867-1937) Frances Nimmo Greene
(1869–1910) William Vaughn Moody
(1872–1949) Mary Lewis Langworthy
(1874–1938) Zona Gale
(1874–1956) Owen Davis
(1874–1965) W. Somerset Maugham
(1875–1956) Percy MacKaye
(1876–1948) Susan Glaspell
(1876–1962) Jules Eckert Goodman
(1878–1942) George M. Cohan
(1878–1952) Ferenc Molnár
(1878–1958) Rachel Crothers
(1880–1948) Peretz Hirschbein
(1880–1957) Sholem Asch
(1881–1972) Padraic Colum
(1882–1928) Avery Hopwood
(1882–1961) Leonhard Frank
(1883–1967) Martin Flavin
(1885–1940) DuBose Heyward
(1885–1942) William Alexander Percy
(1886–1958) Zoë Akins
(1887–1961) George S. Kaufman
(1887–1962) Robinson Jeffers
(1887–1968) Edna Ferber
(1887–1974) George Kelly
(1887–1995) George Abbott
(1888–1953) Eugene O'Neill
(1888–1959) Maxwell Anderson
(1888–1962) H. Leivick
(1888–1965) T. S. Eliot
(1889–1946) John Colton
(1889–1954) John L. Balderston
(1889–1968) Howard Lindsay
(1890–1980) Marc Connelly
(1890–1984) Frances Goodrich
(1891–1939) Sidney Howard
(1891–1957) Philip Dunning
(1891–1966) Anne Nichols
(1892–1950) Edna St. Vincent Millay
(1892–1966) Elmer Greensfelder
(1892–1982) Archibald MacLeish
(1893–1966) Russel Crouse
(1893–1973) S. N. Behrman
(1894–1962) E. E. Cummings
(1894–1964) Ben Hecht
(1894–1977) John Howard Lawson
(1894–1981) Paul Green
(1895–1943) Lorenz Hart
(1895–1952) Alfred Neumann
(1895–1956) Charles MacArthur
(1895–1960) Oscar Hammerstein, II
(1895–1966) Joseph Fields
(1896–1949) Philip Barry
(1896–1960) Edwin Justus Mayer
(1896–1974) Lawrence Riley
(1897–1958) F. Hugh Herbert
(1899–1967) Edgar Neville
(1899–1980) Elliott Nugent
(1900–1998) Julien Green
(1901–1969) Jack Kirkland
(1901–1984) Denis Johnston
(1901–1988) Paul Osborn
(1902–1967) Langston Hughes
(1902–1967) Joseph Kesselring
(1903–1987) Clare Boothe
(1904–1961) Moss Hart
(1904–1986) Christopher Isherwood
(1905–1964) Marc Blitzstein
(1905–1984) Lillian Hellman
(1906–1963) Clifford Odets
(1906–1995) Sidney Kingsley
(1907–1973) W. H. Auden
(1907–1981) Mary Coyle Chase
(1908–1981) William Saroyan
(1909–1981) Ketti Frings
(1909–1984) Norman Krasna
(1910–1961) Antanas Škėma
(1911–1983) Tennessee Williams
(1911–2004) Jerome Chodorov
(1911–2007) Gian Carlo Menotti
(1912–1998) Félix Morisseau-Leroy
(1912–1999) Garson Kanin
(1913–1973) William Inge
(1913–2000) N. Richard Nash
(1914–2008) William Gibson
(1915–2005) Arthur Miller
(1914–1956) John La Touche
(1917–1970) William Archibald
(1917–1967) Carson McCullers
(1917–2009) Robert Anderson
(1918–1993) Louis O. Coxe
(1918–2011) Arthur Laurents
(1919–1949) Thomas Heggen
(1922–1999) William Alfred
(1922–2003) George Axelrod
(1922–2006) Jay Presson Allen
(1922–2008) Tad Mosel
(1923–1981) Paddy Chayefsky
(1923–1995) Michael V. Gazzo
(1924–1987) James Baldwin
(1925–1995) Charles Gordone
(1925–2015) Frank D. Gilroy
(1927–1998) James Goldman
(1927–2018) Neil Simon
(1928–2016) Edward Albee
(born 1928) George Herman
(born 1929) Jules Feiffer
(1930–1965) Lorraine Hansberry
(1930–2020) Bruce Jay Friedman
(1932–2003) Jack Gelber
(1934–2014) Imamu Amiri Baraka (LeRoi Jones)
(1935–2020) Mart Crowley
(1937–2021) Arthur Kopit
(born 1937) Tina Howe
(born 1938) John Guare
(born 1938) Elizabeth Forsythe Hailey
(1938–2017) Janusz Głowacki
(1939–2020) Israel Horovitz
(1939–2020) Terrence McNally
(born 1940) Janet Noble
(1943–1987) Charles Ludlam
(1943–2017) Sam Shepard
(born 1945) Mac Wellman
(born 1947) David Mamet
(born 1949) Christopher Durang
(born 1953) Milcha Sanchez-Scott
(born 1956) Tony Kushner
(born 1958) Jane Shepard
(born 1961) CJ Hopkins
(born 1961) Jon Robin Baitz
(born 1962) Michael Hollinger
(born 1962) Kenneth Lonergan
(born 1965) Tracy Letts
(born 1965) Laura Pedersen
(born 1965) Peter Sagal

Puerto Rico
See also: List of Puerto Rican writers
(1783–1873) María Bibiana Benítez
(1876–1944) Luis Lloréns Torres
(1919–1979) René Marqués
(born 1936) Luis Rafael Sánchez
(1944–2004) Pedro Pietri
(1946–1988) Miguel Piñero
(born 1955) José Rivera